Rebekah Uqi Williams (born March 3, 1950) is a Canadian politician who served as the acting commissioner of Nunavut from June 22, 2020, when Nellie Kusugak's term ended, until January 14, 2021, when Eva Aariak took office. She has been the Deputy Commissioner of Nunavut since December 20, 2019. She also served as a former territorial level politician from Arctic Bay, Northwest Territories, now part of Nunavut. Williams previously served as a member of the Legislative Assembly of Nunavut from 2000 until 2004.

Williams was elected in a by-election in the Quttiktuq electoral district on December 4, 2000. She defeated seven other candidates with 21% of the vote including former MLA Levi Barnabas who had previously vacated the seat after he pleaded guilty to assault as well as former Northwest Territories MLA Tommy Enuaraq.

Williams served a partial term in office, and ran for re-election in the 2004 Nunavut general election. Despite increasing her popular vote she was defeated by Barnabas.

References

 

Members of the Legislative Assembly of Nunavut
21st-century Canadian politicians
Living people
Women MLAs in Nunavut
21st-century Canadian women politicians
People from Arctic Bay
People from Iqaluit
Canadian Inuit women
1950 births
Inuit from the Northwest Territories
Inuit from Nunavut